North Galway was a UK Parliament constituency in Ireland, returning one Member of Parliament from 1885 to 1922.

Prior to the 1885 United Kingdom general election the area was part of the Galway County constituency. From 1922, on the establishment of the Irish Free State, it was not represented in the UK Parliament.

Boundaries
This constituency comprised the northern part of County Galway. The boundaries were redefined in 1918 to take account of the transfer of the district electoral division of Rosmoylan from County Galway to County Roscommon under the 1898 Local Government Act.

1885–1918: The baronies of Ballymoe, Clare and Dunmore.

1918–1922: The rural districts of Glennamaddy and Tuam.

Members of Parliament

Elections

The elections in this constituency took place using the first past the post electoral system.

Elections in the 1880s

Elections in the 1890s

Elections in the 1900s

Elections in the 1910s

References

Westminster constituencies in County Galway (historic)
Dáil constituencies in the Republic of Ireland (historic)
Constituencies of the Parliament of the United Kingdom established in 1885
Constituencies of the Parliament of the United Kingdom disestablished in 1922